The 1998 European Marathon Cup was the 6th edition of the European Marathon Cup of athletics and were held in Budapest, Hungary, inside of the 1998 European Championships.

Results

See also
1998 European Athletics Championships – Men's Marathon
1998 European Athletics Championships – Women's Marathon

References

External links
 EAA web site

European Marathon Cup
European
International athletics competitions hosted by Hungary
European Marathon Cup
Marathon